KKLD (95.9 FM, "The Cloud") is a commercial radio station located in Cottonwood, Arizona, broadcasting to the Flagstaff-Prescott, Arizona area.  KKLD airs a classic hits music format syndicated by ABC Radio Network.

In addition to its usual music programming, through the months of September to December, the station broadcasts the high school football games of the Bradshaw Bears of Bradshaw Mountain High School in Prescott Valley, Arizona. The games are commentated by Matt Showalter.

History
KKLD previously aired a modern rock music format under the call letters of KZGL branded as "The Z" with its slogan "The Total Rock Experience" (primary) or "We Just Suck a Little Less" (secondary). In 2006, the former KKLD call-letters and "The Cloud" branding moved from 98.3 FM to 95.9 FM and changed its format to a classic hits format.

External links
 KKLD official website

 
 

KLD
Classic hits radio stations in the United States
Radio stations established in 1983